

The beginning

Durden and Co. commenced business as general engineers to the automotive industry in 1948. The founder Frank Reginald Durden produced his first woodworking machine, a thicknesser, in 1951. This was quickly followed with the introduction of the popular "Pacemaker" universal woodworker in 1954. Several models of the 'Pacemaker" were produced in the ensuing years and exported to different countries around the world.

Growth

The years from 1960 saw the company grow with the introduction of a range of machinery for the 'Do it yourself' market and educational training.  The range included thicknessers, circular saws, planers, bandsaws and wood lathes.

Today

Today Durden machines are used in industry and technical colleges. The Durden Top Turn Wood Lathe is offered with electronic variable speed drives, knee bar stop actuation and modular bed design.

Engineering companies of Australia